Zahida Khan may refer to:
 Zahida Khan (Pakistani politician)
 Zahida Khan (Indian politician)